The 1988–89 Eastern Counties Football League season was the 47th in the history of Eastern Counties Football League a football competition in England.

Premier Division

The Premier Division featured 21 clubs which competed in the Eastern Counties League last season, no new clubs joined the division this season.

League table

Division One

It was the first Division One season, it was formed by:
Clubs joined from the Peterborough and District League:
Coalite Yaxley
Downham Town
Huntingdon United
Long Sutton Athletic
Somersham Town
Warboys Town
Clubs joined from the Anglian Combination:
Diss Town
Fakenham Town
Wroxham
Plus:
Bury Town reserves
Halstead Town, transferred from the Essex Senior League
Loadwell Wanderers, joined from the Ipswich Sunday League
King's Lynn reserves
Mildenhall Town, joined from the Cambridgeshire County League

League table

References

External links
 Eastern Counties Football League

1988-89
1988–89 in English football leagues